DRI Capital Inc. is a Toronto-based fund manager of healthcare royalty funds, a type of private equity fund. Its CEO is Behzad Khosrowshahi, the son of Iranian business magnate Hassan Khosrowshahi.

Investment strategy
DRI Capital operates funds that buy long-term royalty rights for pharmaceutical products from the inventors, research institutions and companies involved with their development

DRI Capital says that it seeks to invest in royalty entitlements on healthcare products which are safe, efficacious and have a compelling value proposition. They claim to invest in products that exhibit a safe and efficacious profile and are medically necessary for patients to improve their health or quality of life, delivering a meaningful impact to the patient population. These products are typically used to treat chronic, critical or rare diseases. They seek out products that are sold by high quality marketers. This includes large pharmaceutical and biotechnology companies and companies with a particular expertise in a specific, relevant segment of the pharmaceutical industry or therapeutic area. They invest in products that benefit from strong patent and/or regulatory protection and focus on products protected from generic and biosimilar competition

Beginning with its third fund in 2013, DRI Capital CEO Behzad Khosrowshahi said that the firm also plans to consider investments in drugs that are in Phase III trials.

DRI Capital, through its managed funds, owns royalties on some of the best-selling biopharmaceutical products in the world including Enbreil etanercept, Eylea, KeyTruda, Remicade, and Rydapt

History
The company was founded in 1992 as Drug Royalty Corporation by Alan Grieve, the company's first president and CEO. In its first fiscal year of operation, it went public on the Toronto Stock Exchange and purchased a royalty interest in the pioneering British biotech firm, Cambridge Antibody Technology Limited.

In 1993, Drug Royalty Corporation (DRC) was listed on the Toronto Stock Exchange

DRC completed the first royalty monetization deal with an individual inventor by purchasing royalties on Johnson and Johnson’s drug, Remicade, in 2001.

On March 11, 2002, Drug Royalty Corporation announced that it had accepted an all-cash bid of $133 million to take private the publicly traded company from a wholly owned subsidiary of Inwest Investments Ltd. Four weeks later, Drug Royalty's new owners replaced then president Jim Webster with Behzad Khosrowshahi, the eldest child and only son of Hassan Khosrowshahi.

Also in 2002, DRC was taken private and rebranded as DRI Capital Inc. In 2005, DRI completed the first investment grade-related securitization of royalties

In 2013, DRI closed its third fund, Drug Royalty III, raising over $1 billion in capital. As of June 30, 2013, Drug Royalty I and Drug Royalty II have collectively acquired more than 40 separate international royalty streams from inventors, universities, research institutes, biotechnology and global pharmaceutical companies located around the world, payable on 29 different leading pharmaceutical products.

In building this portfolio, DRI led the way with numerous milestone transactions, including the first transaction outside the United States, the first transaction with an individual inventor, the first transaction on a diagnostic, the first transaction on a life science tool and the first transaction involving a bundle of royalty streams. Further, DRI's managed funds have completed more repeat transactions with prior counterparties than any other royalty monetization firms, reinforcing DRI's leading reputation in the industry.

This same year, DRI celebrated its 20th anniversary, announcing the completion of over $600 million in transactions for 2012.

In 2016, DRI purchased a portion of MRC technology’s (now known as LifeArc) royalty interest in Merck’s Keytruda, a leading oncology drug.

In 2018, DRI purchased royalties on Spinraza, the first FDA approved treatment for Spinal Muscular Atrophy.

In February 2020, DRI Capital said today it was seeking to raise $350m by listing DRI Healthcare, a closed-ended investment company, on the London Stock Exchange’s premium segment.

References

External links
 DRI Capital website

Private equity firms of Canada
Companies based in Toronto
Financial services companies established in 1992